Let Yourself In is the debut album by Brazilian indie pop singer Tiago Iorc, released in March 2008.

Track listing
All songs written by Tiago Iorc except where noted.
 "No One There" – 3:55
 "Blame" – 3:53
 "Fine" – 3:08
 "Nothing But a Song" – 3:15
 "Scared" – 3:35
 "Ticket to Ride" – 3:43 (John Lennon, Paul McCartney)
 "There's More to Life" – 4:05
 "It's Not Time" – 4:29
 "My Girl" – 3:29 (R. White, W. Robinson)
 "When All Hope Is Gone" – 5:19
 "Nothing But a Song" (Acoustic) – 3:03

Reception
Halley: "The sonority of their music got what consecrated artists take years to conquer". Leoni: the "impressive voice" mentioned the singer and composer. Serginho Herval: I am "happy when it arrives to my hands the work of an unquestionable talent, with perfect musicality and of good high taste. Although still debuting in the career, his talent lets a maturity worthy of the great consecrated artists to appear. His personality singing, playing and composing is of a really amazing odd quality that there is a lot was not heard."

Chart positions

Personnel
Credits adapted from Let Yourself In booklet liner notes.
Tiago Iorc – lead vocals
Daniel Gordon – drums
Rodrigo Tavares – guitar
Rodrigo Nogueira – bass guitar
Leomaristi dos Santos – double bass

Release history

References 

2008 debut albums
Tiago Iorc albums